The Public Health Engineering Department is a department of the government of Khyber Pakhtunkhwa which is responsible for the provision of clean drinking water, hygiene facilities, and a healthy environment to the public of Khyber Pakhtunkhwa. The department also plans, executes, and maintains the supply of drinking water and sanitation schemes in Khyber Pakhtunkhwa. Muhammad Idrees Khan is the secretary, and Shakeel Ahmad Khan is the current minister of public health engineering.

History 
The department was established in 1974 as a secondary branch. It was upgraded to an administrative department in 1992. Later in 2001, it was merged into the Communication and Works Department. In November 2009, it became an independent department.

Functions 
The department has been assigned different functions related to public welfare.
 Planning, execution and maintenance of drinking water supply and sanitation schemes in rural areas.
 Setting standards and specifications for various types of construction materials or equipment.
 Water quality monitoring, including maintenance of a water quality data base.
 Research and material testing pertaining to PHE sector projects.
 Determination of water tariff and collection of water charges.
 Services matters, except those entrusted to the Establishment and Administration Department.
 Engineering trainings and short skill development courses.

Organization 
The department has 4 CEs (chief engineer), 20 SE/DD, 52 Xens/DE, 100 SDOS/ADEs, 206 S/Es, 1426 support staff and 9292 operational staff.

Committee on Public Health Engineering Department 
Asia Saleh Khattak currently heads the 14-member KP assembly committee on the Public Health Engineering Department.

References

External links 
 PHED KP

Khyber Pakhtunkhwa ministries
Government of Khyber Pakhtunkhwa
Departments of Government of Khyber Pakhtunkhwa
Khyber-Pakhtunkhwa